Lambula hypopolius is a moth of the family Erebidae first described by Walter Rothschild in 1916. It is found along the coastline of northern New Guinea, from Papua New Guinea and Karkar Island to Batanta Island.

References

Moths described in 1916
Lithosiina